School for Husbands is a 1937 British comedy film directed by Andrew Marton and starring Rex Harrison, Diana Churchill and June Clyde.

The film was an independent production which was shot at Shepperton Studios. It was distributed by the newly-formed General Film Distributors. It was based on a 1932 play by Frederick J. Jackson.

Synopsis
Two married men who neglect their wives become concerned when they begin spending time with Leonard Drummond, a handsome and charming novelist with a notorious reputation as a womaniser. They hatch a plan to see if their wives are conducting affairs which involves pretending to go to Paris then returning unexpectedly. However complications ensue when their car breaks down on the way back from Newhaven. The long night that follows really becomes a test of the fidelity and love of their wives.

Cast
 Rex Harrison as Leonard Drummond  
 Diana Churchill as Marion Carter 
 June Clyde as Diana Cheswick 
 Henry Kendall as Geoffrey Carter 
 Romney Brent as Morgan Cheswick  
 Roxie Russell as Kate  
 Richard Goolden as Whittaker  
 Phil Thomas as Chauffeur  
 Judith Gick as Joan  
 Joan Kemp-Welch as Maid 
 Clive Baxter as Boy

References

Bibliography
Low, Rachael. Filmmaking in 1930s Britain. George Allen & Unwin, 1985.
Wood, Linda. British Films, 1927–1939. British Film Institute, 1986.

External links

1937 films
British romantic comedy films
British black-and-white films
1930s English-language films
Films directed by Andrew Marton
Films set in London
British films based on plays
1937 romantic comedy films
Films shot at Shepperton Studios
1930s British films